Duke of Andría is a hereditary title in the Peerage of Spain, accompanied by the dignity of Grandee and granted in 1507 by Ferdinand II to "El Gran Capitán" (Gonzalo Fernández de Córdoba), a general who negotiated the Surrender of Granada and led the Spanish to victory in the Italian Wars. It is a victory title, making reference to the town of Andria in the Province of Bari, Italy.

After the death of the 1st Duke, Ferdinand II prohibited the inheritance and use of the Dukedoms of Andría, Terranova and Montalto and thus the title was unofficially held by some of his Italian descendants for more than 300 years. However, in 1904, Alfonso XIII formally rehabilitated the title on behalf of José Alfonso de Bustos, a legitimate descendant of the 1st Duke, who legally became the 2nd Duke of Andría.

Dukes of Andría (1507)

Gonzalo Fernández de Córdoba y Enríquez de Aguilar, 1st Duke of Andría (1453-1515)

Dukes of Andría (1904)

José Alfonso de Bustos y Ruiz de Arana, 2nd Duke of Andría (1883-1940), direct descendant of the 1st Duke
María Teresa de Bustos y Figueroa, 3rd Duchess of Andría (1914-2008), niece of the 2nd Duke
María Teresa Roca de Togores y Bustos, 4th Duchess of Andría (b. 1938), daughter of the 3rd Duchess

See also
List of dukes in the peerage of Spain
List of current Grandees of Spain

References

Dukedoms of Spain
Grandees of Spain
Lists of dukes
Lists of Spanish nobility